Conor Niland is the defending champion.
Benoît Paire won the title after defeating Grega Žemlja 6–7(6–8), 6–4, 6–4 in the final.

Seeds

Draw

Finals

Top half

Bottom half

References
 Main Draw
 Qualifying Draw

ATP Salzburg Indoors - Singles
ATP Salzburg Indoors